Events from the year 1844 in Canada.

Incumbents
Monarch: Victoria

Federal government
Parliament: 2nd (starting November 28)

Governors
Governor General of the Province of Canada: Charles Poulett Thomson, 1st Baron Sydenham
Governor of New Brunswick: William MacBean George Colebrooke
Governor of Nova Scotia: Lucius Cary, 10th Viscount Falkland
Civil Governor of Newfoundland: John Harvey
Governor of Prince Edward Island: Henry Vere Huntley

Premiers
Joint Premiers of the Province of Canada —
William Henry Draper, Canada West Premier
Samuel Harrison, Canada East Premier

Events
March 5 – The Toronto Globe is founded by George Brown
May 10 – Government moves from Kingston to Montreal.
Amnesty in Montreal provides for Papineau's return.

Births
January 19 – William Mulock, politician and Minister (died 1944)
February 20 – Joshua Slocum, seaman, adventurer, writer, and first man to sail single-handedly around the world (died 1909)
March 7 – Andrew George Blair, politician and 6th Premier of New Brunswick (died 1907)
May 8 – Théotime Blanchard, farmer, merchant and politician (died 1911)
October 22 – Louis Riel, politician and Métis leader (died 1885)

Deaths
January 8 – William Warren Baldwin, doctor, militia officer, jp, lawyer, office holder, judge, businessman, and politician (born 1775)
February 6 – William Abrams, businessman, jp, judge, office holder, and militia officer (born 1785)

References 

 
Canada
Years of the 19th century in Canada
1844 in North America